London Necropolis may refer to:

 Brookwood Cemetery, also known as the London Necropolis
 London Necropolis Company, operators of Brookwood Cemetery
 London Necropolis railway station, near Waterloo station in London